María Betancourt is the name of

 María Betancourt (diver) (born 1994), Venezuelan diver
 María Cristina Betancourt (born 1947), Cuban discus thrower